Stereochlaena is a genus of African plants in the grass family.

 Species
 Stereochlaena annua Clayton - Tanzania
 Stereochlaena caespitosa Clayton - Tanzania, Malawi
 Stereochlaena cameronii (Stapf) Pilg. - Tanzania, Malawi, Zambia, Zimbabwe, Angola, Mozambique, Botswana, Limpopo
 Stereochlaena tridentata Clayton - Tanzania

 formerly included
see Baptorhachis 
 Stereochlaena foliacea - Baptorhachis foliacea

References

Panicoideae
Poaceae genera
Flora of Africa
Taxa named by Eduard Hackel